The 2005 Men's NORCECA Volleyball Championship was the 19th edition of the Men's Continental Volleyball Tournament, played by eight countries in the NORCECA zone, which encompasses North America, Central America and the Caribbean, from September 8 to September 16, 2005 in the MTS Centre in Winnipeg, Manitoba, (Canada).

Competing nations

Squads

Preliminary round

Group A

Saturday September 10

Sunday September 11

Monday September 12

Group B

Saturday September 10

Sunday September 11

Monday September 12

Final round

Quarter-finals
Tuesday 2005-09-13

Semi-finals
Wednesday 2005-09-14

Finals
Thursday 2005-09-15 — Bronze Medal Match

Thursday 2005-09-15 — Gold Medal Match

Final ranking

United States qualified for the 2005 Men's Volleyball Grand Champions Cup

Awards

Most Valuable Player
  

Best Scorer
  

Best Spiker
  

Best Defender
  

Best Blocker
  

Best Server
  

Best Setter
  

Best Receiver
  

Best Libero

References
 Results 

Men's NORCECA Volleyball Championship
N
N
Volleyball
Sports competitions in Winnipeg
Men's NORCECA Volleyball Championship
Men's NORCECA Volleyball Championship